Tun Mohamed Raus bin Sharif (born 4 February 1951) is a retired Malaysian lawyer who served as the eighth Chief Justice of Malaysia from 1 April 2017 until 31 July 2018. He replaced Arifin Zakaria.

Education 
He began his formal education at Kampung Astana Raja Primary School in Rembau and went on to complete his secondary education in Tunku Besar Secondary School in Tampin. He completed his STPM certificate in Sekolah Tuanku Abdul Rahman (STAR), Ipoh, Perak.

He obtained Bachelor of Laws from University of Malaya in 1976 later obtained Master of Laws from the London School of Economics in 1987.

Career 
He joined Legal and Judicial Services as a magistrate in 1976.

On 1 November 1994, he was made a Judicial Commissioner in the High Court at Kuala Lumpur. On 12 January 1996, he was appointed as a Judge at the High Court of Malaya. Since then, he had served Shah Alam High Court, Muar High Court, Penang High Court and Kuala Lumpur High Court.

On 28 July 2006, he was appointed as a Judge of the Court of Appeal of Malaysia. On 12 September 2011, he was promoted as President of the Court of Appeal of Malaysia.

In 2017, his tenure as the Chief Justice of Malaysia was extended further. The re-appointments of Md Raus and Zulkefli to their respective posts were controversial, as their terms were extended after they reached the mandatory retirement age of 66 years and six months. Bar Council called the move "unconstitutional" and will cause "widespread and severe erosion of public confidence in the judiciary and its independence".

Family 
He is married to Toh Puan Salwany Mohamed Zamri and has two children.

Honours 
  :
  Officer of the Order of the Defender of the Realm (KMN) (1994)
  Commander of the Order of Loyalty to the Crown of Malaysia (PSM) - Tan Sri (2011)
  Commander of the Order of the Defender of the Realm (PMN) - Tan Sri (2012)
  Grand Commander of the Order of Loyalty to the Crown of Malaysia (SSM) - Tun (2017)

  :
  Grand Knight of the Order of Loyalty to Tuanku Muhriz (SSTM) - Dato' Seri (2010)

  :
  Grand Knight of the Order of Sultan Ahmad Shah of Pahang (SSAP) - Dato' Sri (2016)

  :
  Companion of the Order of the Defender of State (DMPN) - Dato' (2000)
  Knight Grand Commander of the Order of the Defender of State (DUPN) - Dato' Seri Utama (2017)

  :
  Grand Commander of the Order of Kinabalu (SPDK) - Datuk Seri Panglima (2016)

  :
  Knight Commander of the Order of the Star of Hornbill Sarawak (DA) - Datuk Amar (2016)

References

External links 
 Website of the Federal Court of Malaysia

Malaysian Muslims
Malaysian people of Malay descent
1952 births
People from Negeri Sembilan
20th-century Malaysian judges
Malaysian people of Minangkabau descent
21st-century Malaysian judges
Knights Commander of the Order of the Star of Hornbill Sarawak
Grand Commanders of the Order of Kinabalu
University of Malaya alumni
Alumni of the London School of Economics
Living people
Chief justices of Malaysia
Presidents of the Court of Appeal of Malaysia
Grand Commanders of the Order of Loyalty to the Crown of Malaysia
Commanders of the Order of the Defender of the Realm
Commanders of the Order of Loyalty to the Crown of Malaysia
Officers of the Order of the Defender of the Realm